The Coos River flows for about  into Coos Bay along the Pacific coast of southwest Oregon in the United States. Formed by the confluence of its major tributaries, the South Fork Coos River and the Millicoma River, it drains an important timber-producing region of the Southern Oregon Coast Range. The course of the main stem and the major tributaries is generally westward from the coastal forests to the eastern end of Coos Bay near the city of Coos Bay.

About 30 other tributaries also enter the bay directly.

Commercial forests cover about 85 percent of the basin.

The river supports populations of chinook and coho salmon, Pacific lamprey, western brook lamprey, shad, steelhead, and coastal cutthroat trout. Since public river-bank access is limited, fishing is often done by boat.

Course
Flowing west from the confluence of the South Fork Coos River and the Millicoma River, the Coos River is bordered by Oregon Route 241 (Coos River Highway) on the right and Coos River Road on the left. Downstream from its source, the river receives Noah Creek from the right  from the river mouth. The river then turns west and north as it enters the bay and splits into two distributaries separated by a marsh. The left-hand channel almost immediately merges with Catching Slough, which enters from the left and continues around the east side of the marsh to meet the Marshfield Channel of the bay.

Discharge

See also
List of rivers of Oregon

References

Works cited
McArthur, Lewis A., and McArthur, Lewis L. (2003) [1928]. Oregon Geographic Names, 7th ed. Portland: Oregon Historical Society Press. .
Sheehan, Madelynne Diness (2005). Fishing in Oregon: The Complete Oregon Fishing Guide, 10th ed. Scappoose, Oregon: Flying Pencil Publications. .
Larsen, Erik. Lamprey in the Coos Estuary. Partnership for Coastal Watersheds, 23 Apr. 2014, www.partnershipforcoastalwatersheds.org/wordpress/wp-content/uploads/2015/10/FINAL-Lamprey-Data-Summary-03122014.pdf. Pamphlet.

External links
Coos Watershed Association
Lamprey in the Coos Estuary

Rivers of Oregon
Rivers of Douglas County, Oregon
Rivers of Coos County, Oregon
Oregon placenames of Native American origin